The Comtessa de Dia (Countess of Die), possibly named Beatritz or Isoarda (fl. c. 1175 or c. 1212), was a trobairitz (female troubadour).

She is only known as the comtessa de Dia in contemporary documents, but was most likely the daughter of Count Isoard II of  Diá (a town northeast of Montelimar now known as Die in southern France). According to her vida, she was married to William of Poitiers, but was in love with and sang about Raimbaut of Orange (1146-1173). Bruckner, Shepard, and White cite Angela Rieger's analysis of the songs, which associates them, through intertextual evidence, with the circle of poets composed of Raimbaut d'Aurenga, Bernart de Ventadorn, and Azalais de Porcairagues. Marcelle Thiébaux, and Claude Marks have associated her not with Raimbaut d'Aurenga but with his nephew or great nephew of the same name. If her songs are addressed to Raimbaut d'Aurenga's nephew Raimbaut IV, the Comtessa de Dia may have been urging the latter to support Raymond V of Toulouse.

It has been hypothesised that the Comtessa de Dia was in fact married to Guillem's son, Ademar de Peiteus, whose wife's name was Philippa de Fay, and that her real lover was Raimbaut de Vaqueiras.

Five of the Comtessa's works survive, including 4 cansos and 1 tenson. Scholars have debated whether or not the Comtessa authored , a tenso typically attributed to Raimbaut d'Aurenga. One reason for this is the similarities between this composition and her own . A second reason references the words in her vida,  ("And she fell in love with Sir Raimbaut d'Aurenga, and made about him many good cansos").

The tenso may have been composed as a response to these songs.

Her song  in the Occitan language is the only canso by a trobairitz to survive with its music intact. The music to A chantar is found only in Le manuscript di roi, a collection of songs copied around 1270 for Charles of Anjou, the brother of Louis IX.

Her extant poems are:

Typical subject matter used by Comtessa de Dia in her lyrics includes optimism, praise of herself and her love, as well as betrayal. In , Comtessa plays the part of a betrayed lover, and although she has been betrayed, continues to defend and praise herself. , on the other hand, uses , with a rhyme scheme of ab' ab' b' aab'.  uses some of the motifs of Idyll II of Theocritus.

In popular culture
She is the subject of a series of historical novels by the East German author Irmtraud Morgner.

Notes

References
 Troubadour Music at the Music Encyclopedia. Accessed February 2008.
  Socialist Magical Realism Irmtraud Morgner's Trobadora Beatrice by Elizabeth Morier. The Complete Review, Volume II, Issue 2-  May, 2001. Accessed February 2008.

Further reading
 

12th-century troubadours
12th-century women writers
12th-century women composers
Trobairitz
1140s births
Date of death unknown
Year of death unknown
Medieval women musicians
Medieval women poets
12th-century women artists
13th-century women artists